The Treaty of Niš was a peace treaty signed on 3 October 1739 in Niš (nowadays South Serbia),  by the Ottoman Empire and Russian Empire, to end the Russo-Turkish War of 1735–1739. The Russians gave up their claim to Crimea and Moldavia but were allowed to build a port at Azov, though without fortifications and without the right to have a fleet in the Black Sea. The war was the result of a Russian effort to gain Azov and Crimea as a first step towards dominating the Black Sea. The Habsburg monarchy entered the war in 1737 on the Russian side, but was forced to make peace with Ottomans at the separate Treaty of Belgrade, surrendering Northern Serbia, Northern Bosnia and Oltenia (the Banat of Craiova), and allowing the Ottomans to resist the Russian push toward Constantinople. In return, the Sultan acknowledged the Habsburg Emperor as the official protector of all Ottoman Christian subjects (see Ottoman millet), a position also claimed by Russia. The Austrian peace treaty, coupled with the imminent threat of Swedish invasion, compelled Russia to accept peace at Niš.

See also
List of treaties
List of treaties of the Ottoman Empire

References

Nis 1739
Nis 1739
Nis
1739 in the Russian Empire
1739 in the Ottoman Empire
18th century in Serbia
Ottoman Empire–Russia treaties